West Heath is an area of South East London within the London Borough of Bexley. It lies south of Abbey Wood and north of Welling.

Transport
West Heath is served by three Transport for London bus services that connect it with areas including Bexleyheath, Abbey Wood, Erith, Woolwich, Thamesmead and North Greenwich. The nearest rail link to the area is at Abbey Wood station.

Notable people
 Samuel Hulse - lived at West Heath House.

References

Districts of the London Borough of Bexley